The Spring Mountains are a mountain range of Southern Nevada in the United States, running generally northwest–southeast along the west side of Las Vegas and south to the border with California.  Most land in the mountains is owned by the United States Forest Service and the Bureau of Land Management and managed as the Spring Mountains National Recreation Area within the Humboldt-Toiyabe National Forest and the Red Rock Canyon National Conservation Area.

Geography
The Spring Mountains range is named for the number of springs to be found, many of them in the recesses of Red Rock Canyon National Conservation Area, which is on the eastern side of the mountains.

The Spring Mountains divide the Pahrump Valley and Amargosa River basins from the Las Vegas Valley watershed, which drains into the Colorado River watershed, by way of Las Vegas Wash into Lake Mead, thus the mountains define part of the boundary of the Great Basin. The Great Basin Divide, (one of the Great Basin region borders) continues north through the Indian Springs Pass region, then turns due east at the perimeter mountain ranges north of Las Vegas.

Mount Charleston

The area around Mount Charleston is protected in the Mount Charleston Wilderness. The main town in the area is also named Mount Charleston (Nevada), which lies in Kyle Canyon. The area is typically 30-40 °F cooler than the valleys below, and it is a popular getaway for Las Vegas residents and visitors. The Lee Canyon (Ski and Snowboard Resort) lies in Lee Canyon on State Highway 156.

Other peaks

In addition to Mount Charleston, other major summits in the Spring Mountains range include Bonanza Peak, McFarland Peak, Mummy Mountain, Griffith Peak, Bridge Mountain, Mount Wilson and Mount Potosi.

Biological diversity 
The Spring Mountains are a sky island ecosystem.

The bases of the mountains are part of the Mojave zone dominated by creosote bush and white bursage, then rising to a blackbush scrub zone, followed by a pygmy conifer zone with juniper, pinyon pine, and mountain mahogany, and topped by a montane zone with many species of conifers around Mt. Charleston and its connecting ridges.

Palmer's chipmunk is endemic to the Spring Mountains.

See also 

 Carpenter Canyon

References

External links 

 USDA Spring Mountain Page
 Overview of the Spring Mountains
 Spring Mountains Peaks: photos, elevations, mileage, and GPS coordinates

 
Humboldt–Toiyabe National Forest
Mountain ranges of the Mojave Desert
Mountain ranges of Nevada
Mountain ranges of Clark County, Nevada
Mountain ranges of the Great Basin